Virtuoso No. 2 is an album by jazz guitarist Joe Pass, released in 1976.

Reception

In his Allmusic review, critic Scott Yanow wrote "Pass' mastery of the guitar is obvious throughout this enjoyable set."

Track listing
"Giant Steps" (John Coltrane) – 3:35
"Five Hundred Miles High" (Chick Corea) – 6:20
"Grooveyard" (Carl Perkins) – 4:46
"Misty" (Erroll Garner, Johnny Burke) – 5:25
"Joy Spring" (Clifford Brown, Jon Hendricks) – 5:10
"Blues for O.P." (Pass) – 4:21
 "On Green Dolphin Street" (Bronisław Kaper, Ned Washington) - 7:43
"Windows" (Corea) – 5:56
"Blues for Basie" (Pass) – 3:39
"Feelings" (Morris Albert) – 3:58
"If" (David Gates) – 5:07
"Limehouse Blues" (Douglas Furber, Philip Braham) – 3:09

Personnel
Joe Pass – guitar

Chart positions

References

Albums produced by Norman Granz
Pablo Records albums
Joe Pass albums
1976 albums
Instrumental albums